Leven station or Leven railway station may refer to:

Leven Station, Mpumalanga, a town in South Africa
Leven railway station (Manitoba), a railway station in Canada
Leven railway station (Fife), a former and proposed railway station on the Fife Coast Railway in Scotland
Leven railway station, a proposed station on the North Holderness Light Railway in England in the early 20th century